This article is a list of terms commonly used in the practice of metalworking – the science, art, industry, and craft of shaping metal.

Processes 
The following is a categorical list of metalworking processes: operations, procedures, techniques, and other actions performed that pertain to or consist of metalworking.

Casting

Casting is the process of creating objects by filling a mold with molten metal and allowing it to cool.

Centrifugal
Continuous
Die
Evaporative-pattern
Full-mold
Lost-foam
Investment
 in art: Lost-wax
Permanent mold
Plaster mold
Sand
Semi-solid metal
Shaw process
Shell molding
Spin

Related terms
Foundry
Crucible
Molding sand
Refractory

Forming

Forming is the process of reshaping metal without adding or removing material.

Hot working
Hot rolling
Carburizing
Drawing
Forging
Forge weld
Oxidising
Extruding
Cold working
Coining
Cutting
Electrohydraulic forming
Electromagnetic forming
Explosive forming
Hydroforming
Progressive stamping
Punching
Rolling
Sinking
Spinning
Swaging
Tube bending
Bending
Shearing
Stamping
Milling
Sanding
Grinding
Cold forging
Cold rolling

Cutting

Cutting is the process of reshaping metal by removing material.

Machining
Boring
Broaching
Drilling
Electrical discharge machining
Electrochemical machining
Electron beam machining
Engraving
Facing
Grinding
Hobbing
Milling
Photochemical machining
Turning
Ultrasonic machining

Joining

Joining is the process of creating metal objects by combining pieces of material.

Brazing
Crimping
Riveting
Soldering
Welding

Finishing
Finishing covers all processes that affect the properties or performance of an object without affecting its form or structure.

Anodizing
Galvanizing
Heat treating
Annealing
Precipitation strengthening
Mass finishing
Patination
Peening
Plating
Polishing

Welding and soldering 

Arc welding
MIG welding
TIG welding
Oxyacetylene welding
Soldering
Brazing
Thermite welding

Tools 
Anvil
Forge
Arbor press
Drill Press
Lathe
Milling machine
Shaper
Guillotine
Bender
Grinding machine
Band saw

Physical properties 
Ductility
Malleability
Hardness
Hardenability
Air hardening
Water hardening
Oil hardening
Work hardening
Case hardening
Brittle fracture
Grain size
Grain orientation
Crystal twinning

Steel 
Grade of hardware
Steel abbreviations
Alloy steel
Carbon steel
High-speed steel
Tool steel
Stainless steel
Pickling
Smooth clean surface

Machine tool parts 

Bed
Carriage
Compound rest
Cross-slide
Headstock
Leadscrew
Spindle
Tailstock
Toolpost

Machine tool accessories 

1-2-3 blocks
Boring head
Chuck
Collets
Dial indicator
Indexing head
Rotary table
Sine bar
Vise

Other 
Draw
Hand scrape (flatness)
Pitch
Rivet
Blue brittleness
Etching

 
Wikipedia outlines